The 2008 Speedway World Cup Qualification (SWC) was a two events of motorcycle speedway meetings used to determine the two national teams who qualify for the 2008 Speedway World Cup. According to the FIM rules the top six nations (Poland, Denmark, Australia, Great Britain, Sweden and Russia) from the 2007 Speedway World Cup were automatically qualified. Qualification was won by Hungary and Czech Republic teams.

Results

Heat details

Miskolc (1) 
Qualifying Round 1
25 May 2008 (4:30 pm)
 Miskolc
Referee:  Mick Bates
Jury President: Boris Kotnjek
Attendance: 3,000

Lonigo (2) 
Qualifying Round 2
30 June 2008 (4:20 pm)
 Ljubljana
Referee:  Jim Lawrence
Jury President:  Andrzej Grodzki
Attendance: 500

References

See also 
 2008 Speedway World Cup

Q